Tchanaga is a town in northern Togo.

Transport 

It is proposed to be served by a railway station on the Togo Railways network.

See also 

 Railway stations in Togo
 Transport in Togo

References 

Populated places in Savanes Region, Togo